Ettringite is a hydrous calcium aluminium sulfate mineral with formula: . It is a colorless to yellow mineral crystallizing in the trigonal system. The prismatic crystals are typically colorless, turning white on partial dehydration. It is part of the ettringite-group which includes other sulfates such as thaumasite and bentorite.

Discovery and occurrence

It occurs within metamorphically altered limestone adjacent to igneous intrusive rocks or within xenoliths. It also occurs as weathering crusts on larnite in the Hatrurim Formation of Israel. It occurs associated with portlandite, afwillite and hydrocalumite at Scawt Hill, Ireland and with afwillite, hydrocalumite, mayenite and gypsum in the Hatrurim Formation. It has also been reported from the Zeilberg quarry, Maroldsweisach, Bavaria; at Boisséjour, near Clermont-Ferrand, Puy-de-Dôme, Auvergne, France; the N’Chwaning mine, Kuruman district, Cape Province, South Africa; in the US, occurrences were found in spurrite-merwinite-gehlenite skarn at the 910 level of the Commercial quarry, Crestmore, Riverside County, California and in the Lucky Cuss mine, Tombstone, Arizona.

Ettringite is also sometimes referred in the ancient French literature as Candelot salt, or Candlot salt.

Occurrence in cement

In concrete chemistry, ettringite is a hexacalcium aluminate trisulfate hydrate, of general formula when noted as oxides:

or,
.

Ettringite is formed in the hydrated Portland cement system as a result of the reaction of tricalcium aluminate with calcium sulfate, both present in Portland cement.

In the cement system, the presence of ettringite depends on the ratio of calcium sulfate to tri-calcium aluminate; when this ratio is low, ettringite forms during early hydration and then converts to the calcium aluminate monosulfate (AFm phase or ). When the ratio is intermediate, only a portion of the ettringite converts to AFm and both can coexist, while ettringite is unlikely to convert to AFm at high ratios.

The following standard abbreviations are used to designate the different oxide phases in the cement chemist notation (CCN):

C = CaO
S = 
A = 
F = 
S̅ = 

H = 
K = 
N = 
m = mono
t = tri

AFt and AFm phases 

It represents a group of calcium aluminate hydrates. AFt has the general formula  where X represents a doubly charged anion or, sometimes, two singly charged anions. Ettringite is the most common and prominent member of the AFt group (X in this case denoting sulfate), and often simply called Alumina Ferrite tri-sulfate (AFt).
It represents another group of calcium aluminate hydrates with general formula  where X represents a singly charged anion or 'half' a doubly charged anion. X may be one of many anions. The most important anions involved in Portland cement hydration are hydroxyl, sulfate, and carbonate.

Structure

The mineral ettringite has a structure that runs parallel to the c axis -the needle axis-; in the middle of these two lie the sulfate ions and  molecules, the space group is P31c. Ettringite crystal system is trigonal, crystals are elongated and in a needle like shape, occurrence of disorder or twining is common, which affects the intercolumn material. The first X-ray diffraction crystallographic study was done by Bannister, Hey & Bernal (1936), which found that the crystal unit cell is of a hexagonal form with a = 11.26 and c = 21.48 with space group P63/mmcand Z = 2. Further X-ray studies ensued; namely Wellin (1956) which determined the crystal structure of thaumasite, and Besjak & Jelenic (1966) which gave confirmation of the structure nature of ettringite.

Upon analyzing the structure of both ettringite and thaumasite, it was deduced that both minerals have hexagonal structures, but different space groups. Ettringite crystals have a P31c with a=11.224 Å, c=21,108 Å, while thaumasite crystals fall into space group P63 with a=11.04 Å, c=10.39 Å. While these two minerals form a solid solution, the difference in space groups lead to discontinuities in unit cell parameters.

Further research

Ongoing research on ettringite and cement phase minerals is performed to find new ways to immobilize toxic anions (e.g., borate, selenate and arsenate) and heavy metals to avoid their dispersion in soils and the environment; this can be achieved by using the proper cement phases whose crystal lattice can accommodate these elements. For example, copper immobilization at high pH can be achieved through the formation of C-S-H/C-A-H and ettringite. The crystal structure of ettringite Ca6Al2(SO4)3(OH)12·26H2O can incorporate a variety of divalent ions: Cu2+, Pb2+, Cd2+ and Zn2+, which can substitute for Ca2+.

See also

 Cement
 Cement chemists notation
 Concrete

References 

Aluminium minerals
Calcium minerals
Cement
Concrete
Hydrates
Sulfate minerals
Geology of Riverside County, California
Crestmore Heights, California
Trigonal minerals
Minerals in space group 159